Segai, also known as Punan Kelai, is a Kayanic language spoken in several communities along the Kelai River, Berau Regency, East Kalimantan, Indonesia.

Phonology

Consonants

Vowels 

External links

Languages of Indonesia
Kayan–Murik languages